Octadecyltrimethoxysilane (OTMS) is an organosilicon compound. This colorless liquid is used for preparing hydrophobic coatings and self-assembled monolayers.  It is sensitive toward water, irreversibly degrading to a siloxane polymer.  It places a C18H39SiO3 "cap" on oxide surfaces.  The formation of OTMS monolayers is used for converting hydrophilic surfaces to hydrophobic surfaces, e.g. for use in certain areas of nanotechnology and analytical chemistry.

See also
 Methyltrimethoxysilane
 Octadecyltrichlorosilane

References

Further reading 
 
 

Silanes
Methoxy compounds